Thomas Noell was the 26th Mayor of New York City, who served from 1701 to 1702.  He was an English-born merchant from an aristocratic family who became a citizen of New York in 1698. He was appointed mayor on September 29, 1701, and took the oath of office on October 14 of that year.  He died in 1702 at his farm in Bergen, New Jersey of smallpox.

See also
List of mayors of New York City

References
Notes

Mayors of New York City
People of the Province of New York
1702 deaths
English emigrants